Schober government may refer to one of the two cabinets of Johannes Schober:
 First Schober government, a short-lived coalition government operating from 1921 to 1922
 Second Schober government, a short-lived coalition government operating from 1922 to 1922

See also 
 Government of Austria
 List of chancellors of Austria